Stockton Hill is a volcanic plug located in the formation known as the Chilcotin Group, which lie between the Pacific Ranges of the Coast Mountains and the mid-Fraser River in British Columbia, Canada.

Location and terrain
Bare Lake is immediately north, Elbow Lake to the southwest, and an unnamed lake to the south-southeast.

See also
 List of volcanoes in Canada
 Volcanism in Canada
 Skoatl Point

References

Volcanic plugs of British Columbia
One-thousanders of British Columbia
Bonaparte Country
Kamloops Division Yale Land District